Kang Il-Won (born 26 December 1959) is a former Justice of the Constitutional Court of Korea. He graduated with degrees in law from Seoul National University (LL.B.) and the University of Michigan Law School (LL.M.). He was also an member of Venice Commission representing South Korea, from 2015.

Career 
Judge, Seoul Criminal District Court, 1985
Judge, Jinju Branch of Masan District Court, 1989
Judge, Eastern Branch of Seoul District Court, 1991
Judge, Seoul Civil District Court, 1994
Judge, Seoul High Court, 1996
Judge, Seoul District Court, 1999
Research Judge, Supreme Court, 2001
Senior Judge, Western Branch of Seoul District Court, 2003
Senior Judge, Seoul Central District Court, 2005
Senior Judge, Daejeon High Court, 2006
Chief of Judicial Policy Office, National Court Administration, 2007
Chief of Planning and Coordination Office, National Court Administration, 2009
Senior Judge, Seoul High Court, 2011
Justice of the Constitutional Court of Korea 2012
Chair, Joint Council on Constitutional Justice, Venice Commission (European Commission for Democracy through Law, since Apr. 2013)
Member of the Bureau, Venice Commission (since Dec. 2015; re-elected Dec. 2017)

References 

South Korean judges
Justices of the Constitutional Court of Korea
1959 births
Living people
Seoul National University School of Law alumni
University of Michigan Law School alumni